Jane Thomas (born March 24, 1966) is a former professional tennis player from the United States.

Biography
Thomas, who grew up in Washington State, played tennis for the UCLA Bruins and was a three-time All-American. She won the 1987 Pac-10 singles championship.

From 1987 to 1990 she competed on the professional tour. As a doubles player she featured in the main draw of all four grand slam tournaments in 1989, reaching her best ranking that year of 106 in the world.

References

External links
 
 

1966 births
Living people
American female tennis players
Tennis people from Washington (state)
UCLA Bruins women's tennis players